Montgomery Ward Building can refer to:
 Montgomery Ward Company Complex, the former administrative offices and distribution center for the Montgomery Ward mail order catalog and department store chain in Chicago, Illinois
 Montgomery Ward Building (Oakland, California), listed on the National Register of Historic Places
 Montgomery Ward Building (Pueblo, Colorado)
 Montgomery Ward Building (Idaho Falls, Idaho)
 Montgomery Ward Building (Evansville, Indiana)
 Montgomery Ward Building (Lewistown, Pennsylvania)
 Montgomery Ward Building (San Angelo, Texas)
 Montgomery Ward Building (Burlington, Vermont), listed on the National Register of Historic Places
 Montgomery Park (Portland, Oregon), formerly known as the Montgomery Ward & Company Building
 Montgomery Plaza, a current mixed-use development in Fort Worth, Texas, which served as a Montgomery Ward warehouse from 1928 to 2001
 Virginia Building in Columbia, Missouri, also known as Montgomery Ward Building

See also
Montgomery Ward Warehouse (disambiguation)